Joson Inmingun (Korean People's Army) is the newspaper of Korean People's Army. It was first published on July 10, 1948.

See also
 List of newspapers in North Korea
 Telecommunications in North Korea
 Media of North Korea

References

External links

Newspapers published in North Korea
Mass media in North Korea
Publications established in 1948
State media
Military newspapers